Kalevi Eskelinen (born 9 October 1945) is a Finnish former racing cyclist. He won the Finnish national road race title in 1969. Additionally, he competed at the 1972 Summer Olympics.

References

External links
 

1945 births
Living people
Finnish male cyclists
People from Sonkajärvi
Olympic cyclists of Finland
Cyclists at the 1972 Summer Olympics
Sportspeople from North Savo
20th-century Finnish people